The 13th Pan American Games were held in Winnipeg, Manitoba, Canada from July 23, 1999 to August 8, 1999.

Medals

Gold

Women's Heavyweight (– 75 kg): Wanda Rijo

Silver

Women's Light-Heavyweight (– 69 kg): Miosotis Heredia

Women's Kumite (+ 60 kg): Katty Acevedo

Men's Lightweight (– 68 kg): Luis Benítez

Bronze

Men's Extra-Lightweight (– 60 kg): Juan Jacinto
Women's Half-Middleweight (– 63 kg): Eleucadia Vargas

Men's Heavyweight (+ 80 kg): Danny Vizcaino

Women's Middleweight (– 63 kg): Sención Quezada
Women's Flyweight (– 48 kg): Guillermina Candelario

See also
Dominican Republic at the 2000 Summer Olympics

References
Results

Nations at the 1999 Pan American Games
P
1999